Normandia is a monotypic genus of flowering plants in the family Rubiaceae. It was described by Joseph Dalton Hooker in 1872. The genus contains only one species, Normandia neocaledonica, which is endemic to New Caledonia. The genus is related to Coprosma and Nertera.

References

External links
Normandia in the World Checklist of Rubiaceae

Flora of New Caledonia
Endemic flora of New Caledonia
Monotypic Rubiaceae genera
Anthospermeae